Peter (I) Fadrique (died between 1350 and 1355), Count of Salona, was the eldest son of Alfonso Fadrique, vicar general of Athens and Neopatras, and Marulla of Verona.

As the Papacy supported the claims of Walter VI of Brienne on the Duchy of Athens, Peter (along with his father and his brother James) was among the Catalan leaders excommunicated on 29 December 1335 by William Frangipani, Latin Archbishop of Patras. Alfonso died in about 1338, and Peter succeeded his father in the County of Salona, the baronies of Loidoriki, Veteranitsa, Aegina, and perhaps Zetouni. 

His possessions were confiscated by the Crown of Aragon sometime between 1350 and Peter's death, which occurred before 1355. The reason for the confiscation is unknown, but after Peter's death his fiefs were restored to his younger brother James, as had been stipulated by Alfonso in his will. Another brother, John, appears as lord of Aegina (and nearby Salamis) already in 1350.

References

Sources
 
  

1350s deaths
Peter
Peter
Peter
People excommunicated by the Catholic Church
People from the Duchy of Athens
Year of birth unknown
Year of death uncertain
14th-century people from the Kingdom of Aragon
Counts of Malta